The Geelong and Melbourne Railway Company operated a total of four 2-2-2WT locomotives between 1856 and 1860. They were later operated by the Victorian Railways between 1860 and 1889.

History

Titania and Oberon 

The first two locomotives were built by Robert Stephenson and Company, being completed and shipped on the vessel Thames on the 1st of August 1855. The first locomotive (serial number 1006) would be named Titania and the second (serial number 1007) would be named Oberon.

Titania - No. 34
Sold to Victorian Railways for £2,756/15 on 3 September 1860, became No.34. Used as a shunter at Williamstown Workshops in 1872. Sold to Swan Hill Shire for £800 in June 1889. Sold to H.V. McKay & Co. (Sunshine Harvester Works). Historical Society of Victoria ask to be retained on 12 September 1925. H.V.McKay & Co. presented one brass number plate to ARHS in 1949.

Oberon - No. 36
Sold to Victorian Railways for £2,756/15 on 3 September 1860 and became No. 36. Used as a shunter at Williamstown Workshops in 1872. Sold to Riley Bros. for £500 in June 1889.

Typhoon and Sirocco

Typhoon - No. 38
Sold to Victorian Railways for £4031/15 on 3 September 1860 and became No. 38. Sold for use as stationary engine in 1872.

Sirocco - No. 40
Sold to Victorian Railways for £3761/15 on 3 September 1860 and became No. 40. Became a stationary engine at Williamstown Workshops in 1872.

References

Specific

2-2-2WT locomotives
Railway locomotives introduced in 1855
Scrapped locomotives
Broad gauge locomotives in Australia
Victorian Railways locomotives
Steam locomotives of Australia
Robert Stephenson and Company locomotives
Avonside locomotives